J.W. Jones or JW-Jones  may refer to:

 J.W. Jones (1894–1979), former president of Northwest Missouri State Teacher's College
 JW-Jones (born 1980), Canadian blues guitarist, singer and songwriter